William Rozier (1908 – 15 January 1983) was a French swimmer. He competed in the men's 200 metre breaststroke event at the 1928 Summer Olympics.

References

External links
 

1908 births
1983 deaths
Olympic swimmers of France
Swimmers at the 1928 Summer Olympics
Place of birth missing
French male breaststroke swimmers